Stephen John Walsh (born December 1, 1966) is an American football coach and former player. He is a former quarterback in the National Football League (NFL) for the Dallas Cowboys, New Orleans Saints, Chicago Bears, St. Louis Rams, Tampa Bay Buccaneers, and Indianapolis Colts. He played college football at the University of Miami.

Early years
Walsh attended Cretin-Derham Hall High School in Saint Paul, Minnesota. As a senior in 1984, he passed for over 2,000 yards and 25 touchdowns, receiving USA Today prep Academic All-America and the Minneapolis-St. Paul Metro football player of the year honors. He also played basketball.

College career
He accepted a football scholarship from the University of Miami. After redshirting a season, he was the backup quarterback to Heisman Trophy winner Vinny Testaverde in 1986.

In 1987, he was named the starter at quarterback over Craig Erickson. He led the Miami Hurricanes to the 1987 national championship (the second ever for the school), while registering 2,249 passing yards, 19 touchdowns and 7 interceptions. 

In 1988, Walsh finished 4th in the Heisman Trophy balloting and runner-up to the Davey O'Brien Award, after posting 3,115 passing yards, 29 touchdowns and 12 interceptions. Against the No. 8 ranked University of Arkansas, he set a school record with 33 completions. He suffered his only defeat as a starter against the University of Notre Dame, 30-31, after passing for 424 yards (second in school history) and losing a shot at the National Championship. He left school in April 1989 and declared for the NFL supplemental draft, skipping his final year of eligibility.

A pro-sized passer, he posted a record of 23–1 in his two seasons. He finished his college career with 410 completions out of 690 attempts, 5369 passing yards, 48 touchdowns, 19 interceptions, was sacked only 14 times and had at least one touchdown pass in 18 of his last 20 games. He was tied with Testaverde for the school record for career touchdown passes (48), before being surpassed by Ken Dorsey in 2002.

In 1999, he was inducted into the University of Miami Sports Hall of Fame. In 2009, he was inducted into the University of Miami Football Ring of Honor.

Statistics

Professional career

Dallas Cowboys
The Dallas Cowboys surprised observers by selecting Walsh with the second overall pick in the NFL Supplemental Draft, even though they had already selected Troy Aikman number one overall in the 1989 NFL Draft and had to surrender by rule an equivalent pick in the 1990 NFL Draft, which would turn out to be the number one overall selection. Walsh started five games as a rookie, while Aikman recovered from a broken finger. He recorded Dallas' only win of the season, a 13–3 victory over the rival Washington Redskins. Against the Kansas City Chiefs, he completed 23 out of 36 passes for 294 yards and one touchdown. He recorded 1,371 yards and 5 touchdowns, while working with an inexperienced supporting cast.

Head coach Jimmy Johnson who was also his coach in Miami, reportedly favored him as the starter, but Walsh was never able to move out of Aikman's shadow and was traded to the New Orleans Saints three games into the 1990 season, in exchange for a first, second and third round draft picks. With the third draft choice the Cowboys selected (#70-Erik Williams), the other two picks (#14-Leonard Russell and #52-Patrick Rowe) were traded to the New England Patriots as a package to move up to the number one overall draft choice to select Russell Maryland.

New Orleans Saints
On September 25, 1990, the Dallas Cowboys traded Walsh to the New Orleans Saints for the Saint's first and third round picks in the 1991 NFL Draft and a second round pick (that could become a first round pick based on performance) in the 1992 NFL Draft.

The Saints acquired Walsh, because quarterback Bobby Hebert was in the middle of a contract hold out that lasted all season long, and John Fourcade got off to a poor start. He generated high expectations after winning his first game against the Cleveland Browns, while throwing 3 touchdown passes. Walsh passed for 1,970 yards and 12 touchdowns, leading the franchise to its second ever playoff appearance, after finishing the season 8–8 and knocking the Cowboys out of the final playoff spot.

The next year, he lost his job after Hebert returned to the team, and would start only 8 games in the following three seasons, while bouncing between the backup and third-string roles behind Hebert (1991-1992) and Wade Wilson (1993). He was waived on April 24, 1994.

Chicago Bears
On April 26, 1994, the Chicago Bears signed Walsh as an unrestricted free agent, reuniting with former Cowboys and Hurricanes defensive coordinator Dave Wannstedt. After the third game of the season he replaced an injured Erik Kramer, posting an 8–3 regular season record as a starter and a 35–18 win against the Minnesota Vikings in the wild card round of the playoffs. The next year, Kramer regained the starting job and Walsh would only play in one game.

St. Louis Rams
On April 10, 1996, he was signed by the St. Louis Rams as a free agent. He started the first three games before being passed on the depth chart by rookie Tony Banks. He completed 33 of 77 passes for 344 yards and had 5 interceptions.

Tampa Bay Buccaneers
On April 16, 1997, he signed with the Tampa Bay Buccaneers to backup Trent Dilfer. He appeared in 17 games during 2 seasons.

Indianapolis Colts
On August 11, 1999, he was signed by the Indianapolis Colts to back up second-year pro Peyton Manning. He was released on February 2, 2000. He finished his career with 713 completions in 1,317 attempts (54.1%), 7,875 passing yards, 40 touchdowns and 50 interceptions, for a passer rating of 66.4.

Coaching career
In December 2008, Walsh accepted the head football coaching job at Cardinal Newman High School in West Palm Beach, Florida. After a 4–6 record in his first season, Cardinal Newman finished 7–4 in 2010 and earned its first playoff appearance since 2005. Walsh coached the team to 10-2 records in 2011 and 2012, before losing in the opening round of the 3A playoffs. In 2013, Walsh led Newman to their First District Championship in 10 years and the Regional Final. It was the school's fifth straight playoff appearance. In April 2015, Walsh accepted the Director of Football position at IMG Academy, replacing Chris Weinke. He joined the Toronto Argonauts' coaching staff in 2017 as a senior assistant.

In February 2018, Walsh became the quarterbacks coach for the Saskatchewan Roughriders.

In February 2020, Walsh became the quarterbacks coach for the Ottawa Redblacks.

In December 2021, Walsh was named the head football coach at his high school alma mater, Cretin-Derham Hall in St. Paul, Minnesota.

Personal life
In 2001, Walsh entered into the Mortgage Banking business. He returned to football in 2009, when he was named the head coach for Cardinal Newman High School.

Walsh is the uncle of fellow Cretin-Derham Hall High School alumnus and National Hockey League defenseman Ryan McDonagh, who currently plays for the Nashville Predators.

See also
 List of NCAA major college football yearly passing leaders

References

External links
Hurricanes Hall of Fame bio

1966 births
Living people
Players of American football from Saint Paul, Minnesota
American football quarterbacks
Miami Hurricanes football players
Dallas Cowboys players
New Orleans Saints players
Chicago Bears players
Los Angeles Rams players
Tampa Bay Buccaneers players
Indianapolis Colts players
Coaches of American football from Minnesota
High school football coaches in Florida
All-American college football players
Toronto Argonauts coaches
Saskatchewan Roughriders coaches